The Hsinchu Taiwan Pavilion Expo Park was a pavilion in East District, Hsinchu City, Taiwan.

History

The pavilion used to be the Taiwan Pavilion at Expo 2010 Shanghai China in Shanghai in April–October 2010. It was moved and reopened in Hsinchu City on 21 February 2013. Afterwards, the Hsinchu City Government purchased the pavilion at a cost of more than NT$450 million. The building is now closed.

Architecture
The pavilion resembled a traditional sky lantern with a height of four stories. It consisted of City Theme Hall, Sky Lantern Platform and Sky Theater.

See also
 List of tourist attractions in Taiwan

References

2013 establishments in Taiwan
Buildings and structures completed in 2013
Former buildings and structures in Taiwan